Rhopalotria mollis is a species of cycad weevil in the beetle family Belidae.

References

Further reading

 
 
 

Belidae
Articles created by Qbugbot
Beetles described in 1890